Seeru is a 2020 Indian Tamil-language action film written and directed by  Rathina Shiva. The film stars Jiiva, Riya Suman, Gayathri Krishnaa and Navdeep in the lead roles, with Varun and Sathish in supportive roles. D. Imman composes music for the film and the film is bankrolled by Ishari K. Ganesh under his production studio Vels Film International. Principal photography commenced on 4 December 2018. The film was released on 7 February 2020 and opened to positive reviews.

Plot 
The film starts off with two girls driving on the road when they are stopped by two policemen, who proceed to attempt to rape them. One of the girls sends a voice message in a WhatsApp group telling their situation. Manimaran (Jiiva) hears the message and rescues them. He is from a neighbouring place called Mayavaram where he runs a local TV channel called Kokkarako TV. This is opposed by the MLA (R. N. R. Manohar), who keeps getting outsmarted by Maran. Exasperated, he pays a local goon named Vyasarpadi Malli (Varun) to kill him. Malli reaches Maran's home, where his pregnant sister Ilakkiya (Gayathri Krishnaa) goes into labour.

Malli takes Ilakkiya to the hospital and admits her while providing her blood. Maran reaches the hospital and finds that his sister is out of danger and has given birth to a boy. Ilakkiya asks Maran to find the person who saved her and to bring him to her so that she can properly thank him. Maran finds out that the person was Malli, who had threatened to kill him. Maran keeps calling him, asking to meet him. Eventually, he finds Malli on the verge of death being backstabbed by his own henchmen. Maran beats up the henchmen who were nearby and admits Malli into Laksha Hospitals. It turns out that Malli's henchmen were ordered to torture Malli by Ashok Mithran (Navdeep), a leading advocate who was stabbed in court and who wants to know who stabbed him. He planned to torture Malli since he knows who did it. Mithran sends more goons to all hospitals, where Maran beats them up and admits them in Aruna Hospitals. Mithran deduces that Malli is in Laksha Hospitals and sends some goons there as well. Maran uses a walkie-talkie that a police officer left in a restaurant in a hurry, masquerading as a police officer. He eventually goes with the goons, who are instructed by Mithran to stand near a phone booth where Malli was last contacted. A girl contacts Malli's phone, which is tracked by Mithran, and he instructs his henchmen to kill her. Simultaneously, the MLA sends a photo of Maran to the henchmen who he is with. A fight breaks out between Maran and the goons where Maran emerges victorious. He saves the girls, who narrate their story to him.

The state topper of their village is Pavithra, who was close friends with the girls. She is interviewed by the press, where she announces that she wants to become a lawyer and eradicate all wrongs in the law system. At the behest of a reporter, she names some cases, which are headed by Mithran, that she will take into account. She further insults Mithran on live television, causing him to get enraged. He sponsors many items to her, including theme park tickets. She is then killed by Mithran there, who then forces her grandfather to state that she was killed by a fall from the Ferris wheel. This enrages her friends who disguise themselves as lawyers and stab Mithran in court and are seen by Malli, who lets them go. They contact him and narrate their story and he agrees to help them before he is tortured by his own henchmen.

Maran is moved by the story and offers to help them, but he is arrested by the police for stealing the walkie-talkie. However, he is let go when it is revealed that the girl he had saved at the beginning of the film is the officer's Wife. He then goes to save the girls who were taken to Mithran. A fight between the two breaks out, where Maran defeats Mithran and lets the girls finish him. The film ends with Malli meeting Maran's sister and Maran's girlfriend Vasuki (Riya Suman).

Cast 
 Jiiva as Manimaran
 Riya Suman as Vasuki
 Gayathri Krishnaa as Ilakkiya
 Navdeep as Ashok Mithran
 Varun as Vyasarpadi Malli
 Sathish as Gopi, Manimaran's friend 
 Jerald Milton as Dubai Mapillai, Manimaran's friend and brother in law 
 Chandni as Pavithra
 Doctor Soori
 Sekar as Kishore
 R. N. R. Manohar as MLA
 Swaminathan as a priest
 BlackSheep Shamni as one of Schoolgirls (Uncredited)
 Ival Nandhini (BlackSheep) as one of the Schoolgirls (Uncredited)

Production 
Rathina Shiva, who is known for his work in Rekka, initially had discussions with actor Silambarasan during March 2018 to team up for a film and reports revealed that STR liked the script of the director with speculations and buzz were created among the audience about the possible shooting of the film within few days following the announcement. However, it was revealed that STR could not progress on the script due to other pending works, and later, the filmmakers hired Jiiva to replace STR as the lead actor for the untitled film.

The shooting of the film commenced in December 2018, and the film was officially launched by Vijay Sethupathi. The filmmakers cast Riya Suman on her Tamil acting debut opposite Jiiva. Navdeep was hired into play the role of antagonist. The film was titled as Seeru in January 2019.

Soundtrack 

The music is composed by D. Imman, and released on Sony Music India label. The album received a mixed review from Moviecrow.

Reception 
The Times of India wrote "Even though it starts off as a mass hero movie, Seeru turns out to be a solid masala movie that nicely balances sentiment and action".The Hindu wrote "Seeru comes across as a film that’s at least a decade old, in terms of its outdated presentation and over-the-top sequences [..] But the surprises within the traditional masala format, and an earnest performance by Jiiva, keep it engaging". Behindwoods wrote "Despite its interesting premise, Seeru could have worked well with an engaging screenplay."Cinema Express wrote "Making a ‘masala film’ doesn’t mean that one can sell anything and expect the audience to lap it up. The lack of coherence or effort in this film is blasphemous. And it is just disheartening to see able actors like Jiiva in such projects".Firstpost wrote "On the whole, Seeru is an unpretentious regular commercial cocktail and watchable to an extent if you have two hours to while away."Sify rated 3 out of 5 stars stating "Seeru starring Jiiva, Varun and Riya is a commercial timepass entertainer that is worth a watch".

See also 
Rekka (2016)

References

External links 

2020 films
2020 action films
2020s Tamil-language films
Films scored by D. Imman
Indian action films
2020s masala films